was a Japanese professional 9 dan Go player.

Biography
Yoshiteru Abe was born in Miyagi Prefecture, Japan and became an insei in 1954. As a member of the Nihon Ki-in, he obtained the rank of 9 dan in 1986. Abe tutored several students, including Masaaki Kanagawa and Jo Kenmochi, as well as his daughter, Yumiko Okada.

Bibliography

Abe, Yoshiteru, Dramatic Moments On the Go Board, Yutopian Enterprises, 2004.
Abe, Yoshiteru, Step Up to a Higher Level, Yutopian Enterprises, 2004.

Awards 
Journalist Club Prize.

References 

1941 births
2009 deaths
Japanese Go players
Go (game) writers